Matthew Charles Harding (26 December 1953 – 22 October 1996) was a British businessman, vice-chairman of Chelsea Football Club and a major financial supporter of New Labour.

Early years and education
Harding was born in Haywards Heath, Sussex, the son of Paul Harding, an insurance executive. He attended Abingdon School in Abingdon-on-Thames from 1964 until 1971. He was a member of the badminton first team, for which he was awarded half-colours, in addition to being a cricket first XI player, captain of the colts cricket team and a member of the hockey second XI. Although he enjoyed the sport, he did not enjoy the school ethos, earning a single 'A' Level in Latin.

In June 1995, he was appointed a "Steward" of Abingdon School and presented the awards at "Leavers' Day".  He also donated £500,000 towards the school's "Mercers Court", a new IT centre where one of the rooms was named ”The Matthew Harding Careers Room" in his honour after his particular interest in offering careers advice to the students. He returned to the school just weeks before his death to speak to a small group of sixth formers about his road to success.

Career
He left school and went to London. Through his father's friendship with Ted Benfield, he joined the insurance brokers Benfield, Lovick & Rees and it was in the insurance industry that he made his fortune, starting out by making the tea and going on to be a director. By 1980, he had acquired a 32% stake in the company, becoming one of Britain's 100 richest men.

Chelsea FC

A lifelong fan of Chelsea Football Club, Harding responded to Chelsea chairman Ken Bates' call for new investment in the club in 1993.   In October 1993, he was appointed as a Chelsea Football Club director.  He invested £26.5 million in the club, including £7.5m towards construction of the North Stand (now the Matthew Harding Stand), £16.5m to buy the Stamford Bridge freehold and transfer funds. However, his time there was marked by frequent clashes with Bates, club chairman and majority shareholder, over the direction to be taken by the club. Bates eventually banned Harding from the Chelsea boardroom and effectively limited his input and influence over the club. The dispute between Bates and Harding was continual and was only stopped after Harding's death in 1996. Bates caused more controversy and upset many Chelsea fans, as well as friends and family of Harding, by calling him "an evil man" just a year after his death.

Death
On 22 October 1996, while flying back from a Chelsea match at Bolton Wanderers, the helicopter Matthew Harding was travelling on crashed near Middlewich, Cheshire, killing Harding along with the pilot and three other passengers, including journalist John Bauldie. He was 42. The crash of the Eurocopter AS355 Écureuil 2 aircraft took place at night and in poor weather. An investigation by the Air Accidents Investigation Branch found that the pilot did not have the experience or qualifications necessary to safely pilot by instruments in such conditions.

Personal life
His son Patrick Harding went on to become a semi-professional footballer who plays for Burgess Hill Town F.C.

See also
 List of Old Abingdonians

References

Sources
 Matthew Harding: Pursuing the Dream by Alyson Rudd Mainstream Publishing (16 October 1997) 
 A Question of Honour by Lord Michael Levy Simon & Schuster (12 May 2008) 

1953 births
1996 deaths
People educated at Abingdon School
Chelsea F.C. chairmen and investors
English football chairmen and investors
Victims of helicopter accidents or incidents
People from Haywards Heath
Victims of aviation accidents or incidents in England
Victims of aviation accidents or incidents in 1996
20th-century English businesspeople